The 2010–11 Northern Colorado Bears men's basketball team represented Northern Colorado University during the 2010–11 NCAA Division I men's basketball season. The Bears, led by first year head coach B. J. Hill, played their home games at the Butler–Hancock Sports Pavilion and are members of the Big Sky Conference. They finished the season 21–11, 13–3 in Big Sky play to capture the Big Sky regular season championship. They also won the 2011 Big Sky Conference men's basketball tournament to receive an automatic bid in the 2011 NCAA Division I men's basketball tournament, their first tournament bid in school history.  In the tournament, they lost in the second round to San Diego State.  However, they were forced to vacate their season and tournament results due to academic fraud and recruiting violations.

Roster

Schedule
 
|-
!colspan=9 style=| Exhibition

|-
!colspan=9 style=| Regular season

|-
!colspan=9 style=| Big Sky tournament

|-
!colspan=9 style=| NCAA tournament

References

Northern Colorado
Northern Colorado
Northern Colorado Bears men's basketball seasons
Northern Colorado Bears men's basketball
Northern Colorado Bears men's basketball